Revest-les-Roches is a commune in the Alpes-Maritimes department in southeastern France.

Its inhabitants are called Revestois.

Toponymy 

The name of the village, as it was first recorded in 1007 (Revestis), comes from the Occitan So Revèst, a variant of revèrs, and means a site exposed to the north.

Population

See also
Communes of the Alpes-Maritimes department

References

Communes of Alpes-Maritimes
Alpes-Maritimes communes articles needing translation from French Wikipedia